Adrian Demond Brown (born February 7, 1974) is an American former professional baseball outfielder who played from 1997 through 2006 in  Major League Baseball (MLB). Brown is a switch-hitter and throws right-handed.

Brown has the ability to play all three outfield positions, mainly center field. He reached the MLB in 1997 with the Pittsburgh Pirates, spending six years with them before moving to the Boston Red Sox (2003) Kansas City Royals (2004), and Texas Rangers (2006). His most productive season came in 2000 with Pittsburgh, when he posted career-highs in batting average (.315), home runs (4), RBI (28), runs (64), doubles (18), and stolen bases (13) in 104 games.

External links

1974 births
Living people
African-American baseball players
Altoona Curve players
American expatriate baseball players in Canada
Augusta GreenJackets players
Baseball players from Mississippi
Boston Red Sox players
Calgary Cannons players
Carolina Mudcats players
Gulf Coast Pirates players
Kansas City Royals players
Lynchburg Hillcats players
Major League Baseball outfielders
Nashville Sounds players
Oklahoma RedHawks players
Omaha Royals players
Pawtucket Red Sox players
Pittsburgh Pirates players
Texas Rangers players
Williamsport Crosscutters players
21st-century African-American sportspeople
20th-century African-American sportspeople